The name Goldengate or GoldenGate may reference:

 Goldengate, an integrated software suite developed by Cullinet ca. 1980
 GoldenGate, replication and data-integration software developed by GoldenGate Software; since 2009 marketed and controlled by Oracle Corporation

See also 
 Golden Gate (disambiguation)